is a men's volleyball team based in Osaka city, Osaka, Japan. It plays in V.League Division 1. The club was founded in 1973. The owner of the club is Suntory.

Honours
Japan Volleyball League/V.League/V.Premier League
Champions (9): 1994-1995, 1999-2000, 2000–2001, 2001-2002, 2002-2003, 2003–2004 2006-2007, 2020-2021, 2021-2022
Runners-up (5): 1984-1985, 1990-1991, 2005–2006, 2010–11, 2014–15
Kurowashiki All Japan Volleyball Championship
Champions (6): 1979, 1985, 1991, 1995, 2000, 2022
Runners-up (3): 1986, 1992, 1999
Emperor's Cup
Champions (1): 2010
Asian Men's Club Volleyball Championship
 Runners-up (2): 2001, 2022
 Third place (1): 2008

Current Roster
The following is team roster of Season 2022-2023
{|class="wikitable sortable" style="font-size:100%; text-align:center;"
! colspan="6"| Team roster – Season 2022-2023|-
!style="width:4em; color:yellow; background-color:#E60000"|No.
!style="width:10em; color:yellow; background-color:#E60000"|Name
!style="width:14em; color:yellow; background-color:#E60000"|Date of birth
!style="width:9em; color:yellow; background-color:#E60000"|Height
!style="width:9em; color:yellow; background-color:#E60000"|Position
|-
||| style="text-align:left;" ||| style="text-align:right;" |||||Middle Blocker
|-
||| style="text-align:left;" ||| style="text-align:right;" |||||Middle Blocker
|-
||| style="text-align:left;" ||| style="text-align:right;" |||||Libero
|-
||| style="text-align:left;" |Atomu Torikai|| style="text-align:right;" |||||Outside Hitter
|-
||| style="text-align:left;" |Peng Shikun|| style="text-align:right;" |||||Middle Blocker
|-
|||| style="text-align:left;" |Alain De Armas|| style="text-align:right;" |||||Outside Hitter
|-
|||| style="text-align:left;" |Soshi Fujinaka|| style="text-align:right;" |||||Libero
|-
||| style="text-align:left;" |Masaki Oya (c)|| style="text-align:right;" |||||Setter
|-
|10|| style="text-align:left;" |Kenya Fujinaka|| style="text-align:right;" |||||Outside Hitter
|-
|11|| style="text-align:left;" |Hata Kosuke|| style="text-align:right;" |||||Outside Hitter
|-
|12|| style="text-align:left;" |Kenji Sato|| style="text-align:right;" |||||Middle Blocker
|-
|13|| style="text-align:left;" | Dmitry Muserskiy|| style="text-align:right;" |||||Middle Blocker
|-
|15|| style="text-align:left;" |Yoshimitsu Kiire|| style="text-align:right;" |||||Libero
|-
|18|| style="text-align:left;" |Takeshi Ogawa|| style="text-align:right;" |||||Middle Blocker
|-
|19|| style="text-align:left;" |Masashi Kuriyama|| style="text-align:right;" |||||Outside Hitter
|-
|20|| style="text-align:left;" |Hiroki Nishida|| style="text-align:right;" |||||Setter
|-
|21|| style="text-align:left;" |Rui Takahashi|| style="text-align:right;" |||||Outside Hitter
|-
|22|| style="text-align:left;" |Kenshin Kuwada|| style="text-align:right;" |||||Outside Hitter
|-
|colspan=5| Head coach:  Kota Yamamura
|}

League results
 Champion'''   Runner-up

External links 
 V.League - Team profile

Japanese volleyball teams
Volleyball clubs established in 1973
Sports teams in Osaka
Suntory